Eyes on You is the eighth extended play by South Korean boy band Got7. It was released by JYP Entertainment and iriver Inc on March 12, 2018. Like their other albums, the members also participated in co-writing and co-producing the songs with the help of other producers including Mirror BOY, D.ham, Munhan Mirror. It contains seven songs, including the singles "Look" and "One and Only You" featuring Hyolyn.

Track listing

Charts

Weekly charts

Year-end charts

Singles

"Look"

"One and Only You"

Certifications

Awards

Music programs

Release history

See also 
 List of Gaon Album Chart number ones of 2018
 List of K-pop songs on the Billboard charts
 List of K-pop albums on the Billboard charts

References

2018 EPs
Got7 EPs
Korean-language EPs
JYP Entertainment EPs
IRiver EPs